Charlie O'Connell (May 7, 1935 – February 9, 2015) was a roller derby skater, considered the premier male star of his sport. He was inducted into the Roller Derby Hall of Fame in 1967, after his first retirement.

He made an immediate impact in his 1953 debut season with the New York Chiefs and was named rookie of the year. Nicknamed "Mr. Roller Derby", he went on to win the league's Most Valuable Player award eight times. He was most commonly associated with the San Francisco Bay Bombers for most of his career.

He initially retired in 1967, but soon returned to the sport and played until 1978, before finally hanging up his skates for good. He estimated he had played "well over 3000 games" during his career.

He was one of the focal points of the 1971 documentary film Derby. He died aged 79 on February 9, 2015.

References

External links
 See photo in Abilene Reporter-News article - via Newspapers.com 

1935 births
2015 deaths
American roller skaters
Roller derby skaters
Sportspeople from New York City